Habib Fida Ali (Urdu: حبیب فدا علی) (1935 - January 7, 2017) was one of Pakistan's most prominent architects, working in the modernist tradition.

Early life
Fida Ali was born in Karachi and attended St. Patrick's primary school there, before in 1952 becoming a boarder at Aitchison College, Lahore, to take his O and A levels. He then became the first Pakistani student to be admitted to the Architectural Association School of Architecture in London, from where he graduated in 1962. He returned to Pakistan in 1963 to join William Perry's architectural practice in Karachi, and established his own practice in 1965.

Career
Habib Fida Ali had worked on the following buildings and architectural projects.

Corporate projects
Shell House (Completed in 1976 First Prize in Limited Competition)
Commercial Union (Completed in 1992)
National Bank Head Office (Renovation)
Cavish Court, Karachi (completed in 1987)
SNGPL Head Office Building, Lahore (completed in 1989)
Commercial Union Assurance Regional Office Building, Karachi (completed in 1992)

Hospitality projects
Midway House Hotel (completed in 1982 Phase I & 2003 -2006 PhaseII)
Memon Medical Institute (completed in 2010)
Infaq  Medical Center (completed in 2006)
Bait-ul-Sukoon  (completed in 2007)
Master Plan JS Hospital Sehwan (completed in 2012)
Police Hospital Garden Karachi  (completed in 2012)

Honors and distinctions
Nominated for the Aga Khan Award for Architecture 1986
Speaker at the forum 2001 at Sri Lankan Institute of Architects, Colombo Sri Lanka to speak on his Fair Face Concrete Buildings.
Karachi conformance of Building & Material Exhibition My Architects – Our Architecture IAPEX 2004
Designed Karachi American School alongside William Perry in 1962

Professional affiliations
National Vice President of the Institute of Architects, Pakistan (IAP)
Member, Master Jury, Aga Khan Award for Architecture, 1983

Death
Habib Fida Ali died on January 7, 2017. The cause of death was reported to be brain hemorrhage.

References

External links
Official site

1935 births
2017 deaths
Aitchison College alumni
Pakistani architects
Pakistani architecture writers
Pakistani urban planners
St. Patrick's High School, Karachi alumni
Architects from Karachi
Writers from Karachi